Pukiidae is a family of ctenophores belonging to the order Cydippida.

Genera:
 Pukia Gershwin, Zeidler & Davie, 2010

References

Tentaculata